StoryBots Super Songs is an American animated children's television series based on the characters from the StoryBots educational apps and videos. It was created and produced by JibJab Bros. Studios (now StoryBots Inc.) and premiered on Netflix on October 7, 2016. Episodes have also been released in full monthly on StoryBots' official YouTube channel.

StoryBots Super Songs serves as a companion show to Ask the StoryBots, the inaugural television series in the StoryBots franchise, which premiered on August 12, 2016, also on Netflix.

Cast 
 Judy Greer as Beep, the main protagonist, a green female knowledgeable StoryBot
 Erin Fitzgerald as Bo, a purple female cheerful StoryBot
 Fred Tatasciore as Bang, a blue male zen and funny StoryBot
 Jeff Gill as Bing, a yellow male crazy and hyperactive StoryBot
 Gregg Spiridellis as Boop, a red male grumpy StoryBot
 Evan Spiridellis as Hap, a bossy StoryBot

Plot 
StoryBots Super Songs centers on the StoryBots, who are curious little creatures who live in the world beneath our screens. However, while its predecessor Ask the StoryBots follows Beep, Bing, Bang, Boop and Bo as they answer a child's single question (like "why is the sky blue?"), the music-centric Super Songs has the characters exploring broader subject areas.

"From the day Ask the StoryBots launched back in August, we’ve been inundated with requests from kids, parents and teachers all over the world for more episodes," said show co-creator Gregg Spiridellis. "We’re happy to be able to answer that call in a fun, new way with StoryBots Super Songs."

"StoryBots caught fire online because of our catchy, short-form music videos on subjects like dinosaurs, shapes, colors, the alphabet and more," said Evan Spiridellis, show co-creator. "This new format lets us tap into that heritage by mixing our trademark tunes with animated and live-action vignettes featuring our lead characters interacting with real kids."

Episodes 
The series premiered with 10 episodes. Each episode focuses on one topic:

Reception 
StoryBots Super Songs was rated "excellent" by the Brigham Young University's Children's Book & Media Review, which noted that the StoryBots "present interesting, complex, and sometimes goofy pieces of information together in a simple, entertaining, and memorable way that children will appreciate," while "the different mix of animation styles and live action in this TV show will keep children on the edge of their seats."

References 

2010s American animated television series
2010s American children's television series
2016 American television series debuts
2016 American television series endings
American children's animated musical television series
American computer-animated television series
American preschool education television series
Animated preschool education television series
2010s preschool education television series
Netflix children's programming
Animated television series by Netflix
American animated television spin-offs
Animated television series about extraterrestrial life
Animated television series about robots
English-language Netflix original programming